The Companions of the Prophet (aṣ-ṣaḥāba meaning "the companions", from the verb  meaning "accompany", "keep company with", "associate with") were the disciples and followers of Muhammad who saw or met him during his lifetime, while being a Muslim and were physically in his presence. "Al-ṣaḥāba" is definite plural; the indefinite singular is masculine , feminine .

Later Islamic scholars accepted their testimony of the words and deeds of Muhammad, the occasions on which the Quran was revealed and other various important matters of Islamic history and practice. The testimony of the companions, as it was passed down through trusted chains of narrators (isnads), was the basis of the developing Islamic tradition. From the traditions (hadith) of the life of Muhammad and his companions are drawn the Muslim way of life (sunnah), the code of conduct (sharia) it requires, and the jurisprudence (fiqh) by which Muslim communities should be regulated.

The two largest Islamic denominations, the Sunni and Shia, take different approaches to weighing the value of the companions' testimonies, have different hadith collections and, as a result, have different views about the ṣaḥābah.

The second generation of Muslims after the ṣaḥāba, born after the death of Muhammad, who knew at least one ṣaḥāba, are called Tābi'ūn (also "the successors"). The third generation of Muslims after the Tābi'ūn, who knew at least one Tābi, are called tābi' al-tābi'īn. The three generations make up the salaf of Islam.

Types 
In Islam, companions of Muḥammad are classified into categories including the Muhajirun who accompanied Muhammad from Mecca to Medina, the Ansar who lived in Medina, and the Badriyyun who fought at the Battle of Badr.

Two important groups among the companions are the Muhajirun "migrants", those who had faith in Muhammad when he began to preach in Mecca and who departed with him when he was persecuted there, and the Ansar, the people of Medina who welcomed Muhammad and his companions and stood as their protectors.

Lists of prominent companions usually run to 50 or 60 names, the people most closely associated with Muhammad. However, there were clearly many others who had some contact with Muhammad and their names and biographies were recorded in religious reference texts such as ibn Sa'd's early Book of the Major Classes. Al-Qurtubi's Istīʻāb fī maʻrifat al-Aṣhāb, who died in 1071, consists of 2770 biographies of male and 381 biographies of female ṣaḥābah.

According to an observation in al-Qastallani's Al-Muwahib al-Ladunniyyah, an untold number of persons had already converted to Islam by the time Muhammad died. There were 10,000 by the time of the Conquest of Mecca and 70,000 during the Expedition of Tabuk in 630. Some Muslims assert that they were more than 200,000 in number: it is believed that 124,000 witnessed the Farewell Sermon Muhammad delivered after making Farewell Pilgrimage to Mecca.

Definitions

Sunni
The most widespread definition of a companion is someone who met Muhammad, believed in him, and died a Muslim. The Sunni scholar ibn Hajar al-Asqalani (d.852 H) said,

Anyone who died after rejecting Islam and becoming an apostate is not considered as a companion. Those who saw him but held off believing in him until after his passing are not considered ṣahābah but tābiʻūn.

According to Sunni scholars, Muslims of the past should be considered companions if they had any contact with Muhammad, and they were not liars or opposed to him and his teachings. If they saw him, heard him, or were in his presence even briefly, they are companions. All companions are assumed to be just (ʻudul) unless they are proven otherwise; that is, Sunni scholars do not believe that companions would lie or fabricate hadith unless they are proven liars, untrustworthy or opposed to Islam.

Some Quranic references are important to Sunni Muslim views of the reverence due to all companions; It sometimes admonishes them, as when Aisha, daughter of the first Sunni caliph Abu Bakr and the wife of Muhammad, was accused of infidelity. 

Differing views on the definition of a companion were also influenced by the debate between the Traditionalists and the Muʿtazila with the traditionalists preferring to extend the definition to as many people as possible and the Mu'tazilites preferring to restrict it.

Shia
The Shia as well as some Sunni scholars like Javed Ahmad Ghamidi and Amin Ahsan Islahi state that not every individual who met or had accidentally seen Muhammad can be considered a companion. In their view, the Qurʻan has outlined a high level of faith as one of the distinctive qualities of the ṣaḥābah. Hence, they admit to this list only those individuals who had substantial contact with Muhammad, lived with him, and took part in his campaigns and efforts at proselytizing. In other words, companion is used to refer to sahaba of the prophet who were in a long-term relationship with him and support him in an essential event up to their death. 
 
In view of such admonitions, the Shia have different views on each ṣaḥābiyy, depending on what they accomplished. They do not accept that the testimony of nearly all ṣaḥābah is an authenticated part of the chain of narrators in a hadith and that not all the ṣaḥābah were righteous just because they saw or were with Muhammad. The Shia further argue that the righteousness of ṣaḥābah can be assessed by their loyalty towards Muhammad's family after his death and they accept hadith from the Imams of the Ahl al-Bayt, believing them to be cleansed from sin through their interpretation of the Qurʻan and the hadith of the Cloak.

Shia Muslims believe that some of the companions are accountable for the loss of the caliphate by Ali's family.

As verses 30-33 from Al-Aḥzāb, Shias believe their argument  that one must discriminate between the virtues of the companions by verses relating to Muhammad's wives.

Baháʼí Faith 
The Baháʼí Faith recognises the companions of Muhammad. They are mentioned in the Kitáb-i-Íqán, the primary theological work of the Baháʼí religion.

Hadith

Sunni views
According to the History of the Prophets and Kings, after the death of the Islamic prophet Muhammad, Abu Bakr, Umar and Abu Ubaydah ibn al-Jarrah and the Anṣār of Medina held consultations and selected Abu Bakr as the first caliph. Then Abd al-Rahman ibn Awf and Uthman, companion and son-in-law of Muhammad and also essential chief of the Banu Umayyah, selected Umar as the second caliph after the death of Abu Bakr and the other Anṣār and Muhajirun accepted him.

Sunni Muslim scholars classified companions into many categories, based on a number of criteria. The hadith quoted above shows ranks of ṣaḥābah, tābi'īn, and tābi' at-tābi'īn. Al-Suyuti recognized eleven levels of companionship.

The general involvement in military campaign with Muhammad by Sahabah were highlighted by the third generation scholar named Ibn al-Mubarak, that once asked about who is better between Mu'awiya ibn Abi Sufyan, who was a companion, and Umar ibn 'Abd al-'Aziz, who was famous for his piety. Ibn al-Mubarak simply responded: "...dust particles in Mu'awiyah's nose (while fighting in Hunayn under Muhammad) were better than six hundred Umar (ibn 'Abd al-'Aziz)...."

Shia views
Following the consultation of companions about the successor of Muhammad, Shi'i scholars, therefore, deprecate hadith believed to have been transmitted from alleged unjust companions and place much more reliance on hadith believed to have been related by Muhammad's family members and companions who supported Ali. The Shia claim that Muhammad announced his successor during his lifetime at Dawat Zul Asheera then many times during his prophethood and finally at the event of Ghadir Khumm.

Shias consider that any hadith where Muhammad is claimed to have absolved all ṣaḥābah from sin is a false report by those who opposed the Ahl al-Bayt.

See also 
 List of Sahabah
 List of non-Arab Sahabah
 The ten to whom Paradise was promised
 Apostles
 Apostles of Baháʼu'lláh

Notes

References

Further reading 
 Osman, Amr, Companions, in Muhammad in History, Thought, and Culture: An Encyclopedia of the Prophet of God (2 vols.), Edited by C. Fitzpatrick and A. Walker, Santa Barbara, ABC-CLIO, 2014.
 Ibn Sa'd al-Baghdadi, Muhammad – The book of The Major Classes, only partially translated into English; see Men of Medina and Women of Medina published by Ta-Ha Publishers, and first two volumes as published by Kitab Bhavan, New Delhi.
 Wilferd Madelung – The Succession to Muhammad, Cambridge University Press, 1997.
 Maxime Rodinson – Muhammad, 1961, as translated into English and published in 1980 by Pantheon Books.
 William Montgomery Watt – Muhammad at Medina, Oxford University Press 1956.

External links 

List of Male Sahaba
List of Female Sahaba
Sahaba: Companions of the Prophet
The Companions of the Prophet as seen by the Shi'a and the Sunnis 
Sermons of the Commander of the Faithful, Imam Ali b. Abi Talib, from Nahj al-Balaghah
Names of Sahabiyat

Islamic terminology
 
Life of Muhammad